Kentucky Music Educators Association (KMEA) is the Kentucky state-level affiliate of The National Association for Music Education.  KMEA consists of over 1,000 professional music educators at all levels from kindergarten to the university level.

Programs

Choruses 
Kentucky high school students are provided the opportunity to participate in the Kentucky All-State Choruses [SATB, SSAA, TTBB].
For elementary and middle school children, KMEA offers the Kentucky Children's Chorus for grades 5–6, and two Kentucky Junior High Choruses for grades 7–9: a treble chorus and a mixed chorus.

Bands and orchestras 
Kentucky high school students also are provided the opportunity to participate in All-State Bands (Concert, Symphonic, Jazz), and the All-State Symphony Orchestra or the Commonwealth String Orchestra, for which the students are chosen from a rigorous audition on their instruments.

Marching band 
See Kentucky State Marching Band Championships

Assessments 
KMEA provides opportunities for students to receive ratings for their performances as soloists or in small ensembles at district-level sites throughout the Commonwealth in what are called Solo and Ensemble Assessments. Qualified evaluators rate student performances and offer suggestions for improvement of their playing skills. For a student to participate in such an event, their music teacher must be a Kentucky Music Educators Association member. Large Ensemble Assessment allow bands, orchestras, and choral groups to play for evaluation at district-level sites. Bands or choirs receiving Distinguished (I) ratings may participate in the State Concert Band or State Choral Assessments held later in the spring of each year.

References

External links
Official website

Arts organizations based in Kentucky
Music education organizations
National Association for Music Education